Kim Yong-il (born 2 May 1944) is a North Korean politician who served as the Premier of North Korea from April 2007 to 7 June 2010. He was elected as Premier by the 5th session of the 11th Supreme People's Assembly (SPA) in April 2007, replacing Pak Pong-ju. He was then replaced by Choe Yong-rim after a rare parliamentary session on 7 June 2010.

He served in the Korean People's Army from 1960 to 1969, and then graduated from the Rajin University of Marine Transport as a navigation officer. He worked as instructor and deputy director of a general bureau of the Ministry of Land and Marine Transport for 14 years.

He was the Minister of Land and Marine Transport from 1994 until his election as Premier in 2007. He oversaw the construction of new facilities at the Ryongnam Ship Repair Factory near the western port of Nampo, at the mouth of the Taedong River.

As Premier, Kim Yong-il was the head of government in the DPRK, which means he appointed ministers and vice-premiers, who were confirmed by the SPA, and he was also responsible for economic and domestic policy. Premier Kim's first major speech at the anniversary of the state's founding largely reinforced state ideology. However, on the economy, he carefully balanced demands for heavy industry with consumer goods, light industry, and agriculture: "We will firmly adhere to the socialist economic construction line of the military-first era and while developing the national defense industry first, we will vigorously ignite the flames of the agricultural revolution and the light industry revolution, thus the food problem and the issue of the people’s consumer goods should be smoothly resolved".

This Kim Yong-il should not be confused with another Kim Yong-il (1955–2000?), the son of the late Kim Il-sung and half-brother of Kim Jong-il, who is said to have died in Germany in 2000.

See also

 Politics of North Korea

References

1944 births
Living people
People from South Hamgyong
Prime Ministers of North Korea
Alternate members of the 6th Politburo of the Workers' Party of Korea
Members of the 6th Central Committee of the Workers' Party of Korea